P. Pardha Saradhi is an Indian plant biologist and a professor at the Department of Environmental Studies of the University of Delhi. The team led by him is reported to have developed a transgenic mustard for the first time in India. He was also in the news for filing a case of plagiarism against KVSK Prasad, his one-time student and Deepak Pental, a former vice-chancellor of Delhi University.

Saradhi did his college education at the University of Delhi, earning a BSc Honors in Botany in 1977, following it up with an MSc in 1979, MPhil in 1980 and a PhD in 1986. He started his career as a lecturer at the S. V. College of Delhi University in 1985 but moved to Jamia Millia Islamia in 1987 and worked there till 2001. He was serving as a reader when he returned to Delhi University that year to take up the position of a professor, a position he holds to date. His studies have been documented by way of a number of articles and ResearchGate, an online repository of scientific articles has listed 120 of them. Besides, he has edited one book, titled, Biophysical Processes in Living Systems. The Department of Biotechnology of the Government of India awarded him the National Bioscience Award for Career Development, one of the highest Indian science awards, for his contributions to biosciences in 2000.

Selected bibliography

Books

Articles

See also 

 Serial analysis of gene expression
 Gene expression
 Functional genomics

Notes

References

External links 
 
 
 
 

N-BIOS Prize recipients
Indian scientific authors
Living people
Delhi University alumni
Academic staff of Delhi University
Scientists from Delhi
Academic staff of Jamia Millia Islamia
Indian geneticists
Indian botanical writers
20th-century Indian botanists
Year of birth missing (living people)